Peter Maher (born November 11, 1949) is a Canadian retired sportscaster. He was the radio voice of the Calgary Flames from their move to Calgary, Alberta, in 1980 until his retirement following the 2013–14 NHL season. He broadcast every Flames game for 33 years on the city's all-sports radio station, CFAC. Maher became known for his catchphrase, "Yeah Baby!" after a significant or important moment, and "You can put it in the win column!" after every Flames win.

Early life 
Maher was born in Campbellton, New Brunswick. He began broadcasting at age 14 where he started announcing the line up for the Campbellton softball league. After high school, he had stints in the International Hockey League and North Shore Hockey League.

Career 
Maher began his professional broadcasting career in 1977 calling play by play for the Toronto Maple Leafs on the radio. In 1980, he became the first ever radio voice of the Calgary Flames. Over his career he became well known as he called 33 straight seasons. Some of his highlights include the 1986 Stanley Cup run, the 1989 Stanley Cup Championship, and the surprising underdog run to the Stanley Cup Finals in 2004.

In November 2006, he was inducted into the NHL Hockey Hall of Fame as a media honoree, the Foster Hewitt Memorial Award winner. He has been inducted into his hometown, Campbellton Sports Hall of Fame, the New Brunswick Sports Hall of Fame and the Maritime Sports Hall of Fame. 

During the 2010 Winter Olympics, Maher was the voice of the hockey broadcast for Sportsnet. He was heard on many radios across Canada as he called Sidney Crosby's iconic "Golden Goal".

On April 29, 2014, Maher announced his retirement. He called a total of 2,954 Flames games and 3,162 NHL games. He was honored prior to a Flames game on November 18, 2014, where he had a broadcast booth named after him at the Scotiabank Saddledome.

References

Canadian radio sportscasters
Calgary Flames announcers
1949 births
Living people
Foster Hewitt Memorial Award winners
National Hockey League broadcasters
People from Campbellton, New Brunswick
New Brunswick Sports Hall of Fame inductees
Toronto Maple Leafs announcers